Jon Henrik Ståhl (born July 31, 1975) is a Swedish actor, playwright, author (among the 2003 book Livskartan) and television host. He studied at Gothenburg Theatre Academy 1995–99. He hosted the children's TV program Bolibompa 1999–2004. He has participated in many Sveriges Television programmes, among them Supersnällasilversara och Stålhenrik and Pomos piano. He has travelled around in Sweden and performed his own play Henrik – en tönt which is about mobbing.

References

External links 
 
 
 

Swedish television hosts
Swedish male actors
Living people
21st-century Swedish dramatists and playwrights
Swedish-language writers
1975 births
Swedish male dramatists and playwrights